The Clash is a Philippine television reality talent competition show broadcast by GMA Network. Originally hosted by Regine Velasquez, Andre Paras and Joyce Pring, it premiered on July 7, 2018 on the network's Sabado Star Power sa Gabi and on Sunday Grande sa Gabi line-up replacing Celebrity Bluff and Lip Sync Battle Philippines in their respective timeslot. The show has aired 4 seasons. Rayver Cruz and Julie Anne San Jose currently serve as the hosts.

Overview
The competition format is one versus everyone wherein the last contestant standing wins.

The show begins with 62 competitors known as Clashers which are paired in two, and the winner to take a seat in the 32-seat semi-finalists who qualify for the second round. A wild card contender from a pair of two is electronically selected from among previous losers in the first elimination round. The semi-finalists battle it out among themselves in pairs in the second round.

The winner of The Clash receives an exclusive management contract from GMA Network, a brand new car, 1 million pesos, and a house and lot.

Hosts

Clash masters
 Regine Velasquez 
 Rayver Cruz 
 Julie Anne San Jose 

Clashmates / Journey hosts
 Andre Paras 
 Joyce Pring 
 Ken Chan 
 Rita Daniela

Judges

 Lani Misalucha 
 Christian Bautista 
 Ai-Ai delas Alas 
 Pops Fernandez

Seasons

Ratings
According to AGB Nielsen Philippines' Nationwide Urban Television People audience shares, the pilot episode of The Clash earned a 20.8% rating.

Accolades

References

External links
 
 
 

2018 Philippine television series debuts
Filipino-language television shows
GMA Network original programming
Philippine reality television series